Nicholas McCarrell (born April 6, 1982), professionally known as Aqua, is an American record producer and composer of film and television scores.  As a record producer, he has most notably worked with Roc-a-fella Records artists Jay-Z, Kanye West, and Beanie Sigel.  His scoring credits include Entourage and George Lopez.

Early career
Aqua began his music career as an intern at MTV News until August 2001.  He began distributing copies of his demo in January 2002 after moving back to Los Angeles, generating a buzz within the Roc-A-Fella camp.  This buzz began Aqua's relationship with Jay-Z, producing "My 1st Song" off of Jay's Black Album.

Television credits

George Lopez
Nicholas became the sole composer of George Lopez in 2002.  He scored every episode from 2002-2007 that aired on ABC, entering syndication one month after the series finale.  On March 8, 2007, it was announced that George Lopez would join the Nick at Nite lineup.  To this date, it continues to be their highest rated series and one of cable's best for an off-network sitcom.  The show currently airs in broadcast syndication on The CW Plus and on Telelatino in Canada.

Entourage
In 2007, Aqua began working as a weekly composer for the HBO series Entourage.

90210
Aqua began working as a weekly composer for the show 90210 in 2009.  The show airs weekly on The CW.

How to Make It in America
Nicholas also composes music for the HBO series How to Make It in America.

Discography

2003

Jay-Z - The Black Album 
 14. "My 1st Song"
 Sample Credit: Los Angeles Negros - "Tu y Tu Mirar...Yo y Mi Canción"

2004

Beanie Sigel - The B. Coming 
 02. "I Can't Go On This Way"
 Sample Credit: Gloria Scott - Love Me, Love Me Or Leave Me, Leave Me

2008

Wale - "100 Miles & Running" 
 20. "Rediscover Me"
 Sample Credit: The Main Ingredient - Rediscover Me

2007

Rich Boy - "Rich Boy" 
 13. "Lost Girls"

2010

YTCracker 
 "California Breeze"

2014

Λllison Taylor 
 "Sail On"

YTCracker 
 "California Breeze"

2015

Bambaata Marley 
 "Waiting for the War"

References

External links
 

1982 births
Living people
Record producers from New York (state)